Santa Cruz Department
 Santa Cruz Department (Bolivia)
 Santa Cruz Department, Chile

See also
 Santa Cruz Province (disambiguation)

Department name disambiguation pages